Gavin Devlin is a Gaelic footballer who plays for the Ardboe club. He is a former member of the Tyrone county team, winning two All-Ireland SFCs.

Playing career

Youth
Devlin had considerable success at county youth level. He has won one All Ireland minor Championship (1998) and two All-Ireland Under 21 Championships in 2000 and 2001.

Senior
Devlin won two All-Ireland medals; in 2003, playing a pivotal role in Tyrone's blanket defence system and as a panel member in 2005.

Management career
Devlin has coached Kildress Wolfe Tones Seniors in Tyrone.

He assisted Mickey Harte during the end of his tenure as Tyrone senior manager, then moved with him to Louth.

References

External links
Interview

Year of birth missing (living people)
Living people
Louth county football team
Tyrone inter-county Gaelic footballers
Winners of one All-Ireland medal (Gaelic football)